The following are international rankings of Qatar.

Cities
Doha
Urban areas by population ranked lower than 131

Demographics
United Nations: Population ranked 155 out of 221 countries
 Population density ranked 128 out of 241 countries
United Nations report World Population Policies 2005, Number of immigrants ranked 53 out of 192 countries

Economy
 United Nations: Human Development Index, ranked 33 out of 182 countries
Nominal GDP 2007, ranked 59 by IMF; ranked 67 by World Bank; ranked 60 by CIA
Nominal GDP per capita 2006, ranked 3 by IMF;  ranked 4 by CIA
 The Economist Quality-of-Life Index 2005, ranked 41 out of 111 countries 
 * World Economic Forum:  Global Competitiveness Report  ranked 22 out of 133 countries
World Economic Forum: Travel and Tourism Competitiveness Report 2008, ranked 48 out of 130 countries

Environment
 Yale University Center for Environmental Law and Policy and Columbia University Center for International Earth Science Information Network: Environmental Sustainability Index, insufficient data to rank countries
 US Department of Energy: CO² emissions per capita 2004, ranked 1 out of 206 countries
The World Factbook: water resources ranked 164 out of 174 countries
 Waste generation: Per capita, the waste generation rate in Qatar is one of the highest in the world. Each person in Qatar generates an average of four pounds of trash every day. Qatar's population generates 2.5 million tons of solid waste every year.

Geography
 Total area ranked out of 234 countries

Military
Center for Strategic and International Studies: active troops ranked out of 166 countries

Politics
 Transparency International: Corruption Perceptions Index ranked 22 out of 180 countries
 Reporters without borders: Worldwide press freedom index, ranked out of 167 countries
The Economist Democracy Index 2007, ranked 144 out of 167 countries

Society
 Save the Children: State of the World's Mothers report 2006, ranked X out of 110 countries
World Health Organization: Suicide rate ranked out of 100 countries
Institute for Economics and Peace: Global Peace Index ranked 16 out of 144 countries

Technology
Brown University Taubman Center for Public Policy 2006: ranked in online government services

Other

See also
Economy of Qatar
Education in Qatar
Military of Qatar
Politics of Qatar
Lists of countries
Lists by country
List of international rankings

References

Qatar